Boston Bolts may refer to:

 Boston Bolts (USL), a soccer team that currently plays in USL League Two
 Boston Bolts (1988–1990), a defunct soccer team that played in the ASL and APSL
 Boston Bolts (lacrosse), a defunct lacrosse team that played in the National Lacrosse League (1974–75)